The Finnish Challenge is a golf tournament on the Challenge Tour, Europe's second tier men's professional golf tour. It was first played at Golf Talma in Talma, Finland, from 2001 to 2003, but took a hiatus from 2004 to 2011. The 2012–14 editions of the tournament were played at the Kytäjä Golf Club in Kytäjä, Hyvinkää, Finland. The 2015 tournament was played at Aura Golf Club in Turku. Since 2016 tournament it has been played at the Vierumäki Resort in Vierumäki.

Winners

Notes

External links
 
Coverage on the Challenge Tour's official site

Challenge Tour events
Golf tournaments in Finland